Ignatowski is a surname of Slavic origin. The name may refer to:
Jim Ignatowski, fictional character on the 1978–83 American TV series Taxi
Ralph Ignatowski (1926–1945), U.S. Marine, killed in battle at Iwo Jima
Vladimir Ignatowski (1875–1942), Russian physicist

Slavic-language surnames